General elections were held in Southern Rhodesia on 27 January 1954 for the seats in the Southern Rhodesian Legislative Assembly. The result was a victory for the United Rhodesia Party, which won 26 of the 30 seats. The candidates of the Rhodesia Labour Party and Southern Rhodesia Labour Party ran as independents.

Results

References

Southern Rhodesia
1954 in Southern Rhodesia
Elections in Southern Rhodesia
Southern Rhodesia
January 1954 events in Africa